The Quill is the first album by Swedish rock band The Quill.

Track listing

Original 1995 release
"Jet of Water" – 4:13 
"Dry" – 5:03 
"Lodestar" – 4:00
"Homespun" – 4:36
"From Where I Am" – 7:46
"The Flood" – 3:37 
"In My Shed" – 4:06 
"Gleam" – 3:55 
"Not a Single Soul" – 4:27 
"In The Sunlight I Drown" – 3:34
"I Lost a World Today" – 7:35
"Sweetly" - 3:32

2000 reissue
"Dry" – 5:03 
"Lodestar" – 4:00
"Homespun" – 4:36
"From Where I Am" – 7:46
"The Flood" – 3:37 
"In My Shed" – 4:06 
"A Sinner's Fame" – 6:21 
"Not a Single Soul" – 4:27 
"In The Sunlight I Drown" – 3:34
"I Lost a World Today" – 7:35
"Sweetly" - 3:32
"I Lost a World Today (Live)" - Hidden Bonus Track

Personnel
 Magnus Ekwall - Vocals
 Christian Carlsson - Guitar
 Anders Haglund - Hammond B3 & Fender Rhodes
 Roger Nilsson - Bass
 George "Jolle" Atlagic - Drums

References

External links
 The Quill at Encyclopaedia Metallum
 The Quill at Discogs

1995 debut albums
The Quill (band) albums